Peronnelle L'Espicière (fl. 1307), was a French spice merchant.  She was the official spice merchant of the King of France between 1299 and 1307, a very unusual office and title for a woman in the 13th-century.

Life
Peronnelle are first noted as a spice merchant in Paris in 1292. She inherited a spice business in companionship with her brother Pierre, which was not uncommon in Paris at the time. However, in the tax register she is taxed for more than her brother and he is only mentioned as "her brother Pierre", which was the formulaic used in official documents when identifying who was the head of the business, which in this case was evidently her.  This separated her from most merchant sisters in Paris, who were normally a passive business partner when inheriting a business with their brothers.

Peronnelle was a successful merchant and are taxed as the biggest tack payer in her neighbourhood Petit Point, where the king lived, between 1296 and 1300. She was also the highest taxed spice merchant in all of Paris.  Her success and dominance in the business is reflected in the tax records: most of the spice merchants in Paris paid a tax of 1 livres, while Peronnelle paid a tax of 6-8 livres.

In 1299, Peronnelle are listed as the official spice merchant delivering spices to the king, with the title Espicière le roy.  This was not a formal office but an honorary title given to those providing spices to the royal family. It was very unusual for a woman to be given the title of royal supplier, and it only occurred a handful of times during the Middle Ages: Peronnelle de Crepon was the king's tapestry master in 1374, another woman by the name Peronnelle was the official glove maker of the king in 1368–75, with Jeanne of Dammartin having the same title in 1387, and Jeanne L'Espicière was the official spice merchant of another member of the royal family, the countess of Artois.

Peronnelle L'Espicière is last mentioned in the year 1307, when she was still the official spice supplier of the king. Documentation is lacking after the year 1307 and her life after that, as well as how long she had the office, is unknown.

References

 Earenfight, Theresa: Women and Wealth in Late Medieval Europe, 2010

13th-century French people
14th-century French businesspeople
13th-century businesspeople
French courtiers
Medieval businesswomen
13th-century French women
14th-century French women